Armin Maier bin Rafi (born 10 July 1997) is a professional footballer who plays as a midfielder for SV Heimstetten. He is a former member of Singapore national under-22 team.

Club career

Youth
Maier started his career in the German club FC 07 Albstadt in his youth years, having migrated to Germany when he was 5 years old.

Young Lions
In 2017, he signed with the Singapore club, Garena Young Lions for the 2017 S.League season.

Selangor FC II
He has officially joined the team Selangor F.C. II on 26 February 2020.

He had a short spell with Víkingur Ólafsvík in the Icelandic third tier in May 2022.

Career statistics
As of 26 November 2022.

International career
Maier is eligible to play for Singapore due to his mother being a Singaporean. He played for the Singapore.

References

External links
 Latest blip no setback for Maier 
Armin Maier at Fupa

1998 births
Living people
Association football midfielders
German footballers
Singaporean footballers
Singapore youth international footballers
Young Lions FC players
FC Kreuzlingen players
Ungmennafélagið Víkingur players
SV Heimstetten players
2. deild karla players
Regionalliga players
Expatriate footballers in Switzerland
Expatriate footballers in Iceland